Shiquanhe, known in Tibetan as Sênggêkanbab or Sênggêzangbo, is the main town and administrative seat of Ngari Prefecture, Tibet Autonomous Region, China. Shiquanhe is located on the bank of Sênggê Zangbo, the source stream of the Indus River, close to its confluence with the Gartang River.

Name 
This modern Chinese-built town is named after the Sengge Zangbo river, the main headwater of the Indus River, on whose banks it is located. It is called "Sengge Zangbo" or "Sengge Khabab" in Tibetan and "Shiquanhe" in Chinese.

Being the headquarters of Ngari Prefecture (which is known in Chinese under the Sinicized form of its name, Ali Prefecture), the town is also commonly known in English as Ngari or Ali Town; this is what many guidebooks use as the primary name for the town.
In Tibetan, Ngari is only the name for the prefecture, and not the town.

Being the county seat of the Gar County, it is also referred to as Gar. it may be labeled that way on maps.

Description 

When the Ngari Prefecture was established by the People's Republic of China in 1959, its capital was at Günsa (or Gar Gunsa), at the settlement called Gar Chongsar (སྒར་གྲོང་གསར), which is now the location of the Ngari Gunsa Airport. 

In 1965, the capital was moved from Günsa to the newly built Shiquanhe town in 1965, due to the extremely difficult living conditions at the former. At that time, Shiquanhe had a population of 400 people.

Shiquanhe is a modern Chinese-style town, situated at the confluence of the Sengge River and the Longchu River. According to a government-affiliated source, the population of  Shiquanhe had grown from just over 1,500 to over 20,000 in 30 years (1978–2008), and people there now "enjoy their life because the city has been equipped with culture and commerce facilities". Western guidebook writers have referred to the place as a "concrete monstrosity of a town".

Shiquanhe has a lion statue in the middle of the town. It has high-rise buildings, restaurants, general stores and nightclubs. There are several primary schools and a secondary school.
It also has two banks, one of which, the Agricultural Bank of China, near the army post west of the roundabout, has foreign exchange facilities. There is also a post and telecom office.

History 

Even though Shiquanhe is a modern town, its location has been of significant importance in history. Not only is it situated in a wide valley of Sengge Zangbo with an abundance of cultivable land, it also lies along a trade route between Gar Gunsa and Rudok, which continues on to Ladakh in the west via the Pangong Lake, and, in the other direction, to Lhasa via the Mayum La pass. The region was historically known as Rala. (See Strachey's map.)

During the Tibetan Era of Fragmentation in the 10th century, Kyide Nyimagon, a descendant of emperor Langdarma, came to Ngari in the midst of chaos in Central Tibet and started a new kingdom in Rala. He is said to have started by building a Kharmar (reddish fort) in the region, also called Ralajong. Later he expanded into the Sutlej Valley and Burang by marrying a princess of Burang. This kingdom came to be known as Guge-Purang.

By the 17th century, Ladakh annexed the entire kingdom of Guge and invited retaliation from Central Tibet under the 5th Dalai Lama. The large of army of Galdan Chhewang, Tibet's general, encamped in the Gar Valley. The first clash with the Ladakhi forces took place near the confluence of the Gartang and Sengge Zangbo, with the locations Langmar and Rala mentioned in the sources. The Ladakhis were defeated and Galdan Chhewang pursued them to Ladakh, leading to the Tibet–Ladakh–Mughal War and the Treaty of Tingmosgang.

Transportation
Ngari Gunsa Airport, near the town of Shiquanhe, started operations on 1 July 2010, becoming the fourth civil airport in Tibet. Air China operates two flights a week from Chengdu to Ngari Gunsa via Lhasa, on Tuesdays and Fridays.

Climate
Shiquanhe has a cold desert climate (Köppen climate classification: BWk) with short, very mild summers and very cold, dry winters.

Ngari Observatory

Also planned for the site is the Ali CMB Polarization Telescope (AliCPT) for studying the polarization of the cosmic microwave background(CMB).  This location is, during winter, as high and dry (and thus good for observations as) the South Pole location of the similar BICEP and Keck Array telescopes, with the tremendous logistical advantage of being 30 minutes' drive from the airport and city.

Construction has begun on the telescope, codenamed Ngari No.1, and it is expected to enter operations in 2023.
It is subsequently officially named AliCPT-1.

The B1 site is located 20 km away from the Ngari Gunsa Airport, with convenient transportation.
After several years of construction, the B1 site provides excellent conditions for carrying out CMB experiments. Infrastructure construction is complete, such as road construction, and has been connected to the city electricity power supply. AliCPT-1 will be operated from a new observatory building built by the Institute of High Energy Physics (IHEP), 850 m² including the operation hall and additional rooms. The site is equipped with three weather stations monitoring pressure, wind speed and direction, and temperature. Grid power, already ready for operation, is the main power source on site; solar panels, a diesel power generator, and a UPS power backup system are also in place. The site is also equipped with high-speed wired data service, full environmental heater/air conditioner units, and all the facilities needed to assemble and operate the receiver, including a crane and a workshop in a high-bay room. For human safety, an on-site oxygen system is present.

Notes

References

External links
Wikimapia
 

Populated places in Ngari Prefecture
Township-level divisions of Tibet